NGC 324 is a lenticular galaxy located in the constellation Phoenix. It was discovered on October 23, 1835 by John Herschel. It was described by Dreyer as "questionable, faint, small, stellar".

References

0324
18351023
Phoenix (constellation)
Discoveries by John Herschel
Lenticular galaxies
003416